Commoptera is a genus of flies in the family Phoridae.

Species
C. affinis Borgmeier, 1928
C. coeci Borgmeier, 1971
C. ecitonis Borgmeier, 1926
C. pygmaea Borgmeier, 1928
C. setiventris Borgmeier, 1971
C. solenopsidis Brues, 1901

References

Phoridae
Platypezoidea genera
Taxa named by Charles Thomas Brues